Kenneth Macaulay (1812 – 29 July 1867) was an English Conservative Party politician. He sat in the House of Commons between 1852 and 1865.

Macaulay was born on 30 September 1812 in Rothley, Leicestershire, England, the son of Rev. Aulay Macaulay, the vicar of Rothley. He was educated at Jesus College, Cambridge, graduating B.A. in 1835. He was a Cambridge Apostle; in 1843, he married Harriet Woollcombe, daughter of W. Woollcombe.

He was elected as a Member of Parliament for Cambridge at the 1852 general election,
but the a petition was lodged and the election was declared void on 1 March 1853. A Royal Commission was established, and the writ of election was suspended until 1854.  Macaulay contested the Cambridge again at the 1857 general election, and regained his seat,
holding it until he stood down at the 1865 general election.

Macaulay died on 27 July 1867, in Shaftesbury Road, Cambridge.

References

External links

1815 births
1867 deaths
Kenneth
Conservative Party (UK) MPs for English constituencies
UK MPs 1852–1857
UK MPs 1857–1859
UK MPs 1859–1865
Alumni of Jesus College, Cambridge